Ukraine participated the Eurovision Song Contest 2005 with the song "Razom nas bahato" written by Roman Kalyn, Roman Kostyuk and Mikola Kulinich. The song was performed by the duo GreenJolly. In addition to participating in the contest, the Ukrainian broadcaster National Television Company of Ukraine (NTU) also hosted the Eurovision Song Contest after winning the competition in 2004 with the song  "Wild Dances" performed by Ruslana. NTU organised a national final in order to select the Ukrainian entry for the 2005 contest in Kyiv. Seventy-five entries competed in the national selection which consisted of sixteen shows: fifteen semi-finals and a final. Nineteen entries qualified to compete in the final, held on 27 February 2005, where "Razom nas bahato" performed by GreenJolly was selected as the winner after gaining the most public televotes with 2,247 votes. The Ukrainian entry caused controversy due to governmental involvement in directly qualifying GreenJolly to the final of the national selection as a wildcard based on their participation in the Orange Revolution, and alleged political overtones of the song "Razom nas bahato". The European Broadcasting Union (EBU) cleared the song for the competition after changing the lyrics.

As the host country, Ukraine qualified to compete directly in the final of the Eurovision Song Contest. Performing in position 16 during the final, Ukraine placed nineteenth out of the 24 participating countries with 30 points.

Background 

The Ukrainian national broadcaster, National Television Company of Ukraine (NTU), broadcasts the event within Ukraine and organises the selection process for the nation's entry. NTU confirmed their intentions to participate at the 2005 Eurovision Song Contest on 29 April 2004. The broadcaster had used internal selections in order to select both the Ukrainian entries in 2003 and 2004. Along with their participation confirmation, it was announced that NTU would organise a national final for the first time to select the 2005 Ukrainian entry.

Before Eurovision

Evrobachennya 2005 - Natsionalyni vidbir 
The Ukrainian national final consisted of fifteen semi-finals held between 14 November 2004 and 20 February 2005 and a final on 27 February 2005. All shows in the competition took place at the NTU Studios in Kyiv, hosted by Maria Orlova and broadcast on Pershyi Natsionalnyi.

Format 
The selection of the competing entries for the national final and ultimately the Ukrainian Eurovision entry took place over three stages. In the first stage, artists and songwriters had the opportunity to apply for the competition. Seventy-five acts were selected and announced on 12 October 2004. The second stage consisted of the televised semi-finals which took place between 14 November 2004 and 20 February 2005 with five acts competing in each show. The winner of each semi-final was selected to advance based on a public televote. The third stage was the final, which took place on 27 February 2005 and featured the fifteen acts that qualified from the semi-finals vying to represent Ukraine in Kyiv as well as an additional four wildcard entries that directly qualified to the final. The winner was selected solely via a public televote. Viewers participating in the public televote during the sixteen live shows had the opportunity to submit their votes for the participating entries via SMS.

Competing entries 
Artists and composers had the opportunity to submit their entries between 1 August 2004 and 20 September 2004, which was later extended to 8 October 2004. A seven-member selection panel consisting of Olena Mozgova (director of music and entertainment at NTU), Volodymyr Orlov (general director of OTV), Eduard Klim (general director of Lavina Music), Serhiy Kuzin (general director of HIT-FM), Oleg Vergelis (editor at the newspaper "Kievskiye Vedomosti"), Andriy Sokolovskyi (editor at the newspaper "Komsomolskaya Pravda in Ukraine") and Oleksandr Ksenofontov (music producer) reviewed the 527 received submissions and shortlisted seventy-five entries to compete in the national final. On 12 October 2004, the seventy-five selected competing acts were announced. The seventy-five acts were allocated to one of fifteen semi-finals during a draw that took place on 3 November. The four wildcard finalists: De Shifer, GreenJolly, Mandry and Tartak, were announced on 24 February 2005.

Shows

Semi-finals 
The fifteen semi-finals took place between 14 November 2004 and 20 February 2005. The performances of the seventy-five entries were filmed earlier on 30 and 31 October 2004. In each semi-final five acts competed and the winner advanced to the final of the competition as determined by a public televote, while the remaining four entries were eliminated.

Final 
The final took place on 27 February 2005. The show was scheduled to take place at the Palace of Sports in Kyiv, however such plans were cancelled due to insufficient funding. The fifteen entries that qualified from the semi-finals and the four wildcard finalists competed, with NeDilya, Sergei Gavrilov and Viktor Pavlik performing their entries in a different language than in the semi-finals. The winner, "Razom nas bahato" performed by GreenJolly, was selected exclusively through a public televote. 6,378 votes were registered by the televote during the show. In addition to the performances of the competing entries, guests included Julia Zabrodskaya, Fedor, Deema, Julia Bodai and 2005 Belarusian Eurovision entrant Angelica Agurbash performing the 2005 Belarusian entry "Boys and Girls".

Controversy

Accusations of rigging
Following the Ukrainian national final, runner-up Ani Lorak launched a protest against the final results and challenged the legitimacy of the results, alleging that the phone lines for her entry was blocked. Solvo International, which organised the televoting, denied the information that there was a falsification of the results and stated that "the results correspond to reality." In addition, Lorak's producer Yuri Falyosa stated that "the political situation won instead of music", referring to the four final wildcards (one of them being GreenJolly) that were added just a week before the show by the Government of Ukraine based on their participation in the Orange Revolution that ended in January 2005. Vitaly Zhuravsky, leader of Christian-Democratic Party of Ukraine, also criticized inclusion of four wildcards stating that it's "a gross violation of the rules of the competition". In response, producer of the national final Olena Mozgova defended the choice of GreenJolly as the Ukrainian Eurovision representative, while stating that the decision to include wildcards as a way for new names and music that emerged after the Orange Revolution to be heard was "quite a healthy proposal", and was not opposed by any of the fifteen finalists that qualified from the semi-finals.

Lyrical subject matter controversy
In March 2005, it was reported that "Razom nas bahato" appeared to have violated two of the Eurovision Song Contest rules. Firstly, it was openly derivative of an older revolutionary song, and therefore was arguably not an original composition, and secondly, the lyrics could be classed as political propaganda. After changing the lyrics at the request of the European Broadcasting Union (EBU), the song was deemed eligible for the contest.

Preparation and promotion
The official music video of "Razom nas bahato", directed by Andrey Novoselov and Vitaly Kokoshka and filmed at the Theater Studio "Kryla" in Lviv, was released on 30 March. A maxi-single, featuring additional mixes, was also released on the same day to promote the song as the Ukrainian Eurovision entry.

At Eurovision
According to Eurovision rules, all nations with the exceptions of the host country, the "Big Four" (France, Germany, Spain and the United Kingdom) and the ten highest placed finishers in the 2004 contest are required to qualify from the semi-final in order to compete for the final; the top ten countries from the semi-final progress to the final. As the host country, Ukraine automatically qualified to compete in the final on 20 May 2006. In addition to their participation in the final, Ukraine is also required to broadcast and vote in the semi-final on 18 May 2006. Ukraine placed nineteenth in the final, scoring 30 points.

In Ukraine, both the semi-final and the final were broadcast on Pershyi Natsionalnyi with commentary by actor, radio DJ and voice-over narrator Yaroslav Chornenkyi. The two shows were also broadcast via radio on the National Radio of Ukraine with commentary by presenter Galyna Babiy. The Ukrainian spokesperson, who announced the Ukrainian votes during the final, was Maria Orlova.

Voting 
Below is a breakdown of points awarded to Ukraine and awarded by Ukraine in the semi-final and grand final of the contest. The nation awarded its 12 points to Moldova in the semi-final and the final of the contest.

Points awarded to Ukraine

Points awarded by Ukraine

References

The Age - Ukraine Eurovision entry is on song. Retrieved 25 March 2008

2005
Countries in the Eurovision Song Contest 2005
Eurovision